George Keim may refer to:

 George May Keim (1805–1861), U.S. Representative from Pennsylvania
 George Keim (American football), American football coach